Khaldar (also Romanized as Khāldār; also known as Kaldar Gedik and Khāldār Gadīk) is a village in Lahijan-e Gharbi Rural District, Lajan District, Piranshahr County, West Azerbaijan Province, Iran. At the 2006 census, its population was 326, in 55 families.

References 

Populated places in Piranshahr County